WFC Lokomotiv Moscow (ZhFK Lokomotiv Moskva) is a Russian Women's association football club based in Moscow. Lokomotiv participates in the Russian Women's Football Championship, the top division of Russian women football, and is affiliated with Lokomotiv Moscow

History 

WFC Lokomotiv was established on 14 February 2018 The current head coach of the Russia women's national football team, Elena Fomina, was appointed as the club's first manager.

Current squad

Out on Loan

Former players

Stadium
The club plays its home games at the Sapsan Arena, which is situated a few metres away from Lokomotiv's main stadium, the RZD Arena.

Honours 
 Russian Women's Football Championship: 2021
Russian Women's Cup: 2020, 2021
Russian Super Cup: 2021

See also

 FC Lokomotiv Moscow
 FC Kazanka Moscow
 RC Lokomotiv Moscow

References

External links
WFC Lokomotiv Moscow official website

Women's football clubs in Russia
FC Lokomotiv Moscow
Football clubs in Moscow